Evgeny Yakovlevich Gomelsky (26 December 1938) is a Russian former professional basketball player and coach. He was inducted into the FIBA Hall of Fame, in 2010.

Playing career
Gomelsky began his club career as a basketball player in 1954, with the Soviet League club Spartak Leningrad. In 1957, he moved to the Soviet League club Rīgas ASK. In 1961, he moved to the Soviet club Lokomotiv Volgograd. He retired from playing club basketball in 1965.

Coaching career

Clubs
Gomelsky started his career as a basketball coach in 1961, with Dynamo Volgograd's youth teams. He became the head coach of the senior men's club of Dynamo Volgograd, in 1963. In 1968, he became the head coach of Dynamo Moscow. In 1973, he became the head coach of the Dynamo Moscow women's team.

In 1979, he returned to the position of head coach of Dynamo Moscow. From 1985 to 1992, Gomelsky was the head coach of both the men's and women's teams of Dynamo Moscow. From 1992 to 1994, he was the head coach of the Israeli Super League club Elitzur Holon. From 1994 to 1995, he was once again the head coach of Dynamo Moscow. From 1995 to 1996, he was the head coach of the Spanish women's league club Godella Women.

National teams
Gomelsky worked as an assistant coach of the Soviet Union women's national team, from 1986 to 1988, under its head coach at that time, Leonid Yachmenjov. Gomelsky then became the Soviet women's national team's head coach. As the head coach of the Soviet women's national team, he won the gold medal at the 1989 EuroBasket Women, the silver medal at the 1990 Goodwill Games, and the gold medal at the 1991 EuroBasket Women.

Gomelsky then worked as the head coach of the CIS Unified women's national team. With the CIS Unified Team, he won the gold medal at the 1992 Barcelona Summer Olympics. After that, Gomelsky worked as the head coach of the Russian women's national team. With Russia's women's national team, he won the bronze medal at the 1995 EuroBasket Women, the silver medal at the 1998 FIBA World Championship Women, and the bronze medal at the 1999 EuroBasket Women.

Post-coaching career
In 2001, Gomelsky became the club President of Dynamo Moscow. He held that position until 2013.

Personal life
Gomelsky's older brother, Alexander, was also a well-known basketball coach, and his nephew, Vladimir, also worked as a basketball player and coach.

See also 
 List of EuroBasket Women winning head coaches

References

External links
 Evgeny Gomelsky at halloffame.fiba.com
 Евгений Гомельский / Eugeniy Gomelsky 
 Пробиться на баскетбольный пьедестал 

1938 births
Living people
ASK Riga players
BC Dynamo Moscow coaches
BC Spartak Saint Petersburg players
FIBA Hall of Fame inductees
Jewish men's basketball players
Russian basketball coaches
Russian men's basketball players
Russian Jews
Soviet basketball coaches
Coaches at the 1992 Summer Olympics
Soviet Jews
Basketball players from Saint Petersburg
Russian expatriate basketball people in Israel
Russian expatriate basketball people in Spain
Coaches at the 2000 Summer Olympics
Soviet women's basketball coaches
Russian women's basketball coaches
Olympic gold medalists for the Unified Team